San Miguel del Robledo is a village and municipality in the province of Salamanca,  western Spain, part of the autonomous community of Castile-Leon. It is located 69 kilometres from the provincial capital city of Salamanca and has a population of 62 people.

Geography
The municipality covers an area of 10 km².  It lies 1030 metres above sea level and the postal code is 37694.

References

Municipalities in the Province of Salamanca